Alexander I (14 August 187611 June 1903) reigned as the king of Serbia from 1889 to 1903 when he and his wife, Draga Mašin, were assassinated by a group of Royal Serbian Army officers, led by Captain Dragutin Dimitrijević.

Accession

Alexander was born on 14 August 1876 to King Milan and Queen Natalie of Serbia. He belonged to the Obrenović dynasty.

In 1889, King Milan unexpectedly abdicated and withdrew to private life, proclaiming Alexander king of Serbia under a regency until he should attain his majority at eighteen years of age. His mother became his regent. His parents were second cousins. In 1893, King Alexander, aged sixteen, arbitrarily proclaimed himself of full age, dismissed the regents and their government, and took the royal authority into his own hands. His action won popular support, as did his appointment of a radical ministry. In May 1894 King Alexander arbitrarily abolished King Milan's liberal constitution of 1888 and restored the conservative one of 1869. His attitude during the Greco-Turkish War (1897) was one of strict neutrality.

In 1894, the young King brought his father, Milan, back to Serbia and, in 1898, appointed him commander-in-chief of the army. During that time, Milan was regarded as the de facto ruler of the country.

Marriage

In the summer of 1900, King Alexander suddenly announced his engagement to Draga Mašin, a disreputable widow of an obscure engineer. Alexander had met Draga in 1897 when she was serving as a maid of honor to his mother. Draga was nine years older than the king, unpopular with Belgrade society, well known for her allegedly numerous sexual liaisons, and widely believed to be infertile. Since Alexander was an only child, it was imperative to secure the succession by producing an heir. So intense was the opposition to Mašin among the political classes that the king found it impossible for a time to recruit suitable candidates for senior posts.

Before making the announcement, Alexander did not consult with his father, who had been on vacation in Karlsbad and making arrangements to secure the hand of German Princess Alexandra Karoline zu Schaumburg-Lippe, sister of Queen Charlotte of Württemberg, for his son, or his Prime Minister Dr. Vladan Đorđević, who was visiting the Universal Exhibition in Paris at the time of the announcement. Both immediately resigned, and Alexander had difficulty in forming a new cabinet. Alexander's mother also opposed the marriage and was subsequently banished from the kingdom.

Opposition to the union seemed to subside somewhat for a time upon the publication of congratulations of Nicholas II of Russia to the king on his engagement and of his agreement to act as the principal witness at the wedding. The marriage duly took place in August 1900. Even so, the unpopularity of the union weakened the king's position in the eyes of the army and the country at large.

Politics and the constitution

King Alexander tried to reconcile political parties by unveiling a liberal constitution of his own initiative in 1901, introducing for the first time in the constitutional history of Serbia the system of two chambers (skupština and senate). This reconciled the political parties, but did not placate the army which, already dissatisfied with the king's marriage, became still more so at the rumors that one of the two unpopular brothers of Queen Draga, Lieutenant Nikodije, was to be proclaimed heir presumptive to the throne.

Alexander's good relations and the country's growing dependence on Austria-Hungary were detested by the Serbian public. Two million Serbs lived in Austria-Hungary, with another million in the Ottoman Empire, although many migrated to Serbia.

Meanwhile, the independence of the senate and of the council of state caused increasing irritation to King Alexander. In March 1903, the king suspended the constitution for half an hour, time enough to publish decrees dismissing and replacing the old senators and councillors of state. This arbitrary act increased dissatisfaction in the country.

Assassination

The general impression was that, as much as the senate was packed with men devoted to the royal couple and the government obtained a large majority at the general elections, King Alexander would not hesitate any longer to proclaim Queen Draga's brother as the heir presumptive to the throne. In spite of this, it had been agreed with the Serbian government that Prince Mirko of Montenegro, who was married to Natalija Konstantinović, the granddaughter of Princess Anka Obrenović, an aunt of King Milan, would be proclaimed heir presumptive in the event that the marriage of King Alexander and Queen Draga was childless.

Apparently to prevent Queen Draga's brother being named heir presumptive, but in reality, to replace Alexander Obrenović with Peter Karađorđević, a conspiracy was organized by a group of Army officers headed by Captain Dragutin Dimitrijević, also known as "Apis", and Novak Perišić, a young Serbian Orthodox militant who was in the pay of the Russian Empire, as well as the leader of the Black Hand secret society which would assassinate Archduke Franz Ferdinand in 1914. Several politicians were also members of the conspiracy and allegedly included former Prime Minister Nikola Pašić. The royal couple's palace was invaded and they hid in a wardrobe in the queen's bedroom. (There is another possibility, used in a Serbian TV history series The End of the Obrenović Dynasty in which the royal couple was in a secret safe room hidden behind the mirror in a common bedroom. The room contained an entrance to a secret passage leading out of the palace, but the entrance was inaccessible due to the placement of the queen's wardrobe over it after the wedding.)

The conspirators searched the palace and eventually discovered the royal couple and murdered them in the early morning of June 11, 1903. They were shot and their bodies mutilated and disembowelled, after which, according to eyewitness accounts, they were thrown from a second-floor window of the palace onto piles of garden manure. The king was only 26 years old. King Alexander and Queen Draga were buried in the crypt of St. Mark's Church, Belgrade.

Honours
 :
 Founder of the Order of St. Prince Lazar, 28 June 1889
 Founder of the Order of Miloš the Great, 1898
 : Grand Cross of the Order of St. Stephen, 1891
 :
 Knight of the House Order of Fidelity, 1894
 Knight of the Order of Berthold the First, 1894
 : Knight of the Order of the Annunciation, 25 November 1896
 : Grand Cross of the Sash of the Three Orders, 5 August 1893
 : Knight of the Order of St. Andrew
 : Grand Cross of the Order of Charles III, with Collar, 24 September 1897

Notes

References

 
 
 

1876 births
1903 deaths
Kings of Serbia
People from Belgrade
19th-century Serbian monarchs
20th-century Serbian monarchs
Obrenović dynasty
Murdered Serbian monarchs
Assassinated Serbian people
Assassinated heads of state
Executed Serbian people
Eastern Orthodox Christians from Serbia
Eastern Orthodox monarchs
Male murder victims
Modern child monarchs
Recipients of the Order of St. Sava
Grand Crosses of the Order of St. Sava
Grand Crosses of the Order of Saint Stephen of Hungary
3
3
3
People murdered in Serbia
Burials at St. Mark's Church, Belgrade
20th-century murdered monarchs
1903 murders in Europe